Dog Island (Motu Piu in Māori) is located in Foveaux Strait some  from Bluff, New Zealand. It holds New Zealand's tallest lighthouse and since the maritime structure was fully automated in 1989, the island has been uninhabited.

Etymology
The name of the island is thought to be descriptive, with the shape of the island appearing like a dog, and the reef on the north-west corner of the island being locally known as the Dog's Tongue. The Māori name (motu: island, and piu: to swing) refers to Māori legend of a large pounamu turning into this island.

Geography

Dog Island Lighthouse

After long discussions, the island was chosen as Southland's first site for a lighthouse; the recommendation was made by the Invercargill Harbour Master to James Alexander Robertson Menzies, the first Superintendent of the Southland Province.

The lighthouse on Dog Island was first operated in August 1865. There were originally three lighthouse keepers with their families on the island. The initial rotating light mechanism had to be wound up hourly, and in 1883, the principal lighthouse keeper died when he fell down the central shaft trying to attach weights to the mechanism. Later, only one keeper lived on the island with his family. The lighthouse was automated in 1989, and the island has since been uninhabited. The lighthouse is the tallest lighthouse in New Zealand, and one of its oldest. Due to its black and white stripes, it might be one of New Zealand's most distinctive lighthouses. The lighthouse is registered by Heritage New Zealand as a Category I structure, with registration number 395.

Despite the lighthouse, the steamer SS Waikouaiti ran aground on 28 November 1939 during dense fog and was wrecked.

Due to its remote location, children could not attend school on the mainland, and supplies arrived by ship every three months. A landing strip was built so that fortnightly supplies could arrive by plane.

Today
There is no public access to Dog Island, but it can be seen from Bluff on a clear day. A Dog Island Motu Piu Charitable Trust has formed to work on heritage preservation and public education. As the island is free of introduced mammalian predators, the trust also plans to reintroduce native species such as tuatara, kiwi and Sooty shearwater to the island. Sarah Dowie, Member of Parliament for the  electorate, is the current deputy chair of the trust. The trust's work was recognised in 2012 in the inaugural Environment and Conservation Awards. Cetaceans such as southern right whales can be spotted around the island during migration seasons.

See also

 Desert island
 List of islands

Notes

References

Islands of Southland, New Zealand
Foveaux Strait
Uninhabited islands of New Zealand